The Readyville Mill is a historic mill located in Readyville, Tennessee, United States. It is located in Cannon County, near the border of Rutherford County.

The original water-powered grist mill was constructed by the community founder Colonel Charles Ready in 1812. Ownership of the mill remained in the family until it burned down during the American Civil War for unknown reasons. Robert Carter rebuilt the current mill in the 1870s and acquired full ownership of it in 1884. After being engaged in several different trades for several different owners, the mill closed in 1978. In 2009, the mill was reopened after a three-year renovation as a privately owned restaurant. The grounds currently consist of five newly restored buildings: The Grist Mill, Granary, Icehouse, Miller's Cabin, and Smokehouse. As of 2023, the restaurant and mill are once again closed after several recent changes of management and ownership.

The mill was added to the National Register of Historic Places on June 12, 1973 and featured on an episode of Tennessee Crossroads in 2015.

References 

Industrial buildings and structures on the National Register of Historic Places in Tennessee
Industrial buildings completed in 1868
National Register of Historic Places in Cannon County, Tennessee
1868 establishments in Tennessee